Blåljus! is a six-volume light pocket series of novels by Margit Sandemo and published by the Swedish subsidiade Boknöje AB of the Norwegian publication Bladkompaniet in year 2004. Blåljus! is the Swedish name of the series, and it was released also in Norwegian in the same year with the name Blålys! It hasn't been translated in English or in any other language, but the English translation of the name could be the Bluelight!

Blåljus! doesn't consist of any supernatural happenings or historical places and persons, depart from the earlier novels by Margit Sandemo. The author followed in this series of novels her previous novel De svarta riddarnas footprints. Both series take their places in the 21st century. It's about an ambulance-driver, Lisa and her colleagues, who are always ready to help people in the moment of distress. The plot moves on in the plain hospital milieu in the fictional Norwegian town called Storestad. The novel describes the life of ambulance drivers in their work as well as in their spare time. Publication of Blåljus! hits the same moment as the 80th birthday of the author.

Titles 

Novel series
Novels by Margit Sandemo
Novels set in Norway
Medical novels
Swedish-language novels